Love Power may refer to:

 "Love Power" (Dionne Warwick song), 1987
 "Love Power" (Will to Power album), 1996
 "Love Power" (Praga Khan song), 2003
 "Love Power" (The Boss song), 2011
 "Love Power" (The KMG's song), Belgian entry in the 2007 Eurovision Song Contest
 "Love Power" (Disney song)", a song from the 2022 film Disenchanted
 "Love Power", a 1967 song by The Sandpebbles
 "Love Power", a song by Ziggy Marley and the Melody Makers
 "Love Power", a song from the 1968 film The Producers
 "Love Power", a 1975 song recorded by Motown singer, songwriter and producer Willie Hutch
 "Love Power", a song by Aice5 from the album Love Aice5

See also
 "Power of Love/Love Power", a 1991 song by Luther Vandross